Creußen is a town in the district of Bayreuth in Bavaria, Germany. It is situated on the Red Main river, 13 km southeast of Bayreuth.

Creußen is famous for its stoneware beer steins.

Creußen is the starting point of the Red Main branch of the Main-Radweg bicycle path which stretches about 600 km along the Main until the mouth into the Rhine.

Notable people 
 Christoph Wirth (1870–1950), German physicist and inventor

References 

Bayreuth (district)